Marmornectes is a genus of pliosaurid known from the Middle Jurassic of Bedfordshire, United Kingdom.

Description
Marmornectes is known from the holotype BEDFM 1999.201, an articulated partial skeleton which includes the skull. It was collected in 1999 from the Sigaloceras enodatum ammonoid subzone of the Peterborough Member, Oxford Clay Formation, which dates to the early Callovian stage of the late Middle Jurassic, about 164.7-163.5 million years ago. It was found in the monotypic locality of Quest Pit, east of Stewartby.

Nevertheless, a cladistic analysis found it to be basal to Peloneustes and other pliosaurids. An undescribed pliosaurid, NHMUK R2439, was found to be the sister taxon of this genus.

Etymology
Marmornectes was first named by Hilary F. Ketchum and Roger B. J. Benson in 2011 and the type species is Marmornectes candrewi. The generic name is derived from marmor, Latin for "marble", and nectes, Greek for "swimmer", thus the meaning is "marble-swimmer". The specific name honors Chris Andrew for finding the only known specimen and donating it to Bedford Museum in 1998.

See also

 List of plesiosaur genera
 Timeline of plesiosaur research

References

Middle Jurassic plesiosaurs of Europe
Fossil taxa described in 2011
Pliosaurids
Oxford Clay
Sauropterygian genera